This is a list of Locomotives of the Polish State Railways.

Steam locomotives

Locomotives of German origin

Passenger locomotives

Freight locomotives

Tank locomotives

Narrow gauge locomotives

Locomotives of Austrian origin

Locomotives from other railways

Locomotives purchased new by PKP

Standard gauge locomotives

Industrial steam locomotives

Narrow gauge steam  locomotives

Diesel locomotives 

(*) Conversion

Narrow gauge diesel locomotives

Electric locomotives 

(*) Conversion
(**) Loan

Diesel multiple units

Narrow gauge diesel multiple units

Electric multiple units

See also 
 PKP classification system
 History of rail transport in Poland

References

External links 

PKP

pl:Lista lokomotyw spalinowych eksploatowanych w Polsce#Lokomotywy wąskotorowe